This is a list of airports in Saint Pierre and Miquelon, sorted by location.

Saint Pierre and Miquelon is an overseas collectivity (or COM) of France, consisting of several small islands off the eastern coast of Canada near Newfoundland.

Airports

See also 
 Transport in Saint Pierre and Miquelon
 List of airports in France
 List of airports by ICAO code: L#Saint Pierre and Miquelon
 Wikipedia: WikiProject Aviation/Airline destination lists: North America#Saint Pierre and Miquelon

References 
 Aeronautical Information Service / Service d'information aéronautique (SIA)
 Aeronautical Information Publications (AIP)
  Union des Aéroports Français 
  Le Service de l'Aviation Civile, the airport Authority for Saint Pierre & Miquelon

External links 

Travel Resources for Saint Pierre & Miquelon
Lists of airports in Saint Pierre and Miquelon:
Great Circle Mapper
FallingRain.com
The Airport Guide
World Aero Data

 
Saint Pierre and Miquelon
Saint Pierre and Miquelon-related lists
Saint Pierre and Miquelon
Saint Pierre and Miquelon